Anna Shackley (born 17 May 2001) is a British road and track cyclist from Scotland, who currently rides for UCI Women's WorldTeam . At the 2020 British National Track Championships, Shackley won the national titles in the points race and the team pursuit events.

Shackley was chosen to be part of the UK's cycling squad at the postponed 2020 Tokyo Olympics where she will contest the time trial and the road race. She competed at the 2022 Commonwealth Games where she finished 10th in the women's road time trial event and 21st in the women's road race.

Major results

2021
 1st  Time trial, National Under-23 Road Championships
 1st Rás na mBan
 2022
 7th Ceratizit Challenge by La Vuelta
 10th Overall Tour de Romandie

References

External links

2001 births
Living people
British female cyclists
British track cyclists
Scottish track cyclists
Olympic cyclists of Great Britain
Cyclists at the 2020 Summer Olympics
Scottish female cyclists
People from Milngavie
Cyclists at the 2022 Commonwealth Games
Commonwealth Games competitors for Scotland
21st-century British women